Víctor Manuel Castañeda Flores (born 21 December 1938) is a Chilean former footballer. He played in one match for the Chile national football team in 1967. He was also part of Chile's squad for the 1967 South American Championship.

Personal life
He is also the uncle of the brothers Víctor Hugo and Cristián, both sons of Hugo, who coincided in Palestino, Universidad de Chile and the Chile national team. In addition, his nephews Marco and Roly were with the Palestino youth ranks, as well as his brother Manuel, who was with the reserve team.

References

External links
 

1938 births
Living people
People from Cachapoal Province
Chilean footballers
Chile international footballers
Association football defenders
Club Deportivo Palestino footballers
Chilean Primera División players